"The Island" is the third single from Australian drum and bass band Pendulum to be released from their third studio album, Immersion. It was released on 19 September 2010.

"The Island" is a song split into two parts; "Dawn" and "Dusk", with "Dawn" receiving the majority of radio airplay. In a recent interview, Rob Swire stated that the premise of lyrics has to do with "two young lovers" and how they overcome adversity. The single includes remixes by DJ and record producer Tiësto, and by drum and bass DJ and record producer Lenzman. A Steve Angello, AN21 and Max Vangeli remix of the song was released as a digital single on 24 November 2010. To promote the single, Pendulum also held a remix competition, releasing a free pack of remix stems taken from the "Dawn" part which was won by Madeon at the age of 16. The "Dusk" part uses a sample from Missy Elliott's "I'm Really Hot". In 2018, American DJ and record producer Skrillex released a remix of this song.

Devin Townsend used the song as a structural basis for his song "Save Our Now" from his fifteenth studio album Epicloud.

Music video
The music video for "Part 1 – (Dawn)" was released to Pendulum's official YouTube page on 2 September 2010. It features a woman awaking on a desolate planet, disorientated and confused of her whereabouts. She then glimpses at another human across the wasteland and chases the person across the dead planet, until it is revealed at the end of the video that she is, in fact, chasing herself. The woman is in a time paradox, seeing, and chasing after versions of herself, who in turn, see and chase after her and so on. The woman wears clothes identical to those worn by the clones in the film The Island, and is shot in similar areas.

As of June 2018, the video has received over nine million views.

Reception
A BBC review declared the song "the absolute standout" of Immersion. The band played it when they went on BBC Radio 1's Live Lounge, and the fan reception to it was overwhelming for the presenter, Fearne Cotton.

Track listings

Personnel
Pendulum
Rob Swire – writer, producer, vocals, mixing
Gareth McGrillen – production assistant
KJ Sawka – percussion

Other contributors
Tiësto – remix
Lenzman – remix
Madeon – remix

Charts

References

2010 singles
Songs written by Rob Swire
2010 songs
Pendulum (drum and bass band) songs